"Cuatro Babys" is a song by Colombian singer Maluma, featuring Puerto Rican recording artists Noriel, Bryant Myers, and Juhn. The song is taken from the album Trap Capos: Season 1 (2016). It was released as the album's first single on 7 October 2016 through Sony Music Latin. Maluma co-wrote the track with Bryant Myers, Noriel, Jorge J. Hernández, Jorge Fonseca, John Pérez and Sharon Ramírez. It was produced by Santana the Golden Boy. The song peaked at number 21 in Colombia and number 15 on the Billboard Hot Latin Songs chart.

Controversy
This song has received much controversy over its lyrics as they arguably appear to suggest direct violence towards women. A petition was posted on Change.org demanding for the removal of the song from digital platforms. Despite this controversy, the popularity of "Cuatro Babys" has only risen with the song having gone quadruple Platinum. Because of this, Latin trap has had a large, but primarily underground, following.

Music video
The music video for "Cuatro Babys" premiered on 14 October 2016 on Maluma's Vevo account on YouTube. The music video was directed by Jose Javy Ferrer and features Maluma, Noriel, Bryant Myers, and Juhn across multiple scenes surrounded by women who obey each of their commands. The music video has over 1 billion views on YouTube.

Charts

Weekly charts

Year-end charts

Certifications

References

External links

Latin trap songs
2016 singles
2016 songs
Maluma songs
Noriel songs
Sony Music Latin singles
Spanish-language songs
Sony Music Colombia singles
Songs written by Maluma (singer)
Obscenity controversies in music